Saint-Christophe-d'Allier (literally Saint-Christophe of Allier; Auvergnat: Sant Cristòu d'Alèir) is a commune in the Haute-Loire department in south-central France.

Geography
The Chapeauroux forms part of the commune's south-eastern border, then flows into the Allier which forms the commune's north-eastern border.

Population

See also
Communes of the Haute-Loire department

References

External links
Saint-Christophe-d'Allier at the official website of the communauté de communes du Pays de Saugues (French)

Communes of Haute-Loire